Zofia Ludwika Cecylia Konstancja Szeptycka de domo Fredro (27 May 1837, Lviv — 17 April 1904, Prylbychi), was a Polish poet and painter. The mother of Andrey Sheptytsky, O.S.B.M., the Metropolitan Archbishop of the Ukrainian Greek Catholic Church (1900–1944), and of the Blessed Hieromartyr Klymentiy Sheptytsky, MSU, an archimandrite of the Order of Studite monks of the Ukrainian Greek Catholic Church.

Biography 
Born in the family of Polish playwright Alexander Fredro. She was educated in Paris and Vienna. In 1855, she was close to the workers of the Hôtel Lambert. In 1856–1861 lived in Lviv, in October 1861 engaged with Jan Kanty Szeptycki. She had seven sons, two of whom died at an early age: Stefan (1862-1864) and Jerzy Piotr (1863-1880). She was a very religious, which deeply influenced her sons to make a decision to serve God. Roman Aleksander Maria later became a monk and took a name Andrey; and Kazimierz Maria became a Studite monk, under a name Klymentiy. Her other son, Stanisław Maria Jan, graduated from the Vienna Military Academy, and then became a general of the Polish Army.  was a landowner,  was also a landowner, living in the family residence of Prylbychi. Leon and his wife were fusilladed by the NKVD in September 1939, in Prylbychi. Aleksander was killed by the Gestapo in 1940, in Zamość.

Works 
Zofia Szeptycka was a painter, who produced portraits of her father, mother, brother and a self-portrait created by her, which are placed in her books, as exhibits. The paintings created by her decorated Catholic churches in Lviv, Kraków, Zhovkva and other places. For the Bernardine Church, Lviv, she painted the portrait of John of Dukla, where the Saint is buried.

Zofia Szeptycka is the author of a number of stories and essays, written as for her family diary. In 1900–1903 she published the book "Memories of the Past Years". In 1904, after her death, newspapers "Gazeta Narodowa" and the Krakówian "Przegląd Polski" for the first time published her stories. She wrote memories about Andrey Sheptytsky's youth years. The two-volume collection of the "Letters" by Zofia Szeptycka was published in Kraków in 1906–1907.

She died on 17 April 1904. Buried in Prylbychi's family land.

Literature 
 Barbara Lasocka: Aleksander Fredro. Drogi życia, Oficyna Wydawnicza Errata, Warszawa 2001, .
 Zbigniew Kuchowicz: Al. Fredro we fraku i w szlafroku. Osobowość i życie prywatne – Łódź: KAW, 1989.
 Zofia Szeptycka: Młodość i powołanie ojca Romana Andrzeja Szeptyckiego zakonu św. Bazylego Wielkiego, oprac. Bogdan Zakrzewski, Wrocław: Towarzystwo Przyjaciół Polonistyki Wrocł., 1993.
 Zofia Szeptycka: Wspomnienia z lat ubiegłych, przyg. do druku, wstępem i przypisami opatrzył B. Zakrzewski, Wrocław: Zakł. Nar. im. Ossolińskich, 1967.

References

Polish painters
1837 births
1904 deaths
Ukrainian memoirists
Fredro (Bończa)
19th-century Polish women writers
Ukrainian women writers
Ukrainian painters
Polish women painters
Ukrainian women painters
19th-century memoirists
19th-century Polish nobility